Mary Gordon (born Mary Gilmour; 16 May 1882 – 23 August 1963) was a Scottish actress who mainly played housekeepers and mothers, most notably the landlady Mrs. Hudson in the Sherlock Holmes series of movies of the 1940s starring Basil Rathbone and Nigel Bruce. Her body of work  included nearly 300 films between 1925 and 1950.

Early life
Gordon was born on 16 May 1882 in Glasgow, Scotland, the fifth of seven children of Mary and Robert Gilmour, a wire weaver. She worked as a dressmaker before finding work on the stage. She became a concert singer when she was 17 years old, but she left that career behind when she married. After her husband died during World War I she opened a boarding house to support her mother, her baby daughter, and herself. Joining a company bound for an American tour, she came to the U.S. in her twenties, apparently making a few appearances on Broadway in small roles, but primarily touring in stock companies. Gordon came to the United States with her mother and daughter soon after World War I ended. After working three months as a waitress in the Robertson-Cole Studios, she became the cook there. She had bit parts in films and coached Katharine Hepburn on using a Scottish dialect for the film The Little Minister.

Career
With her mother and daughter, she arrived in Los Angeles in the mid-1920s and began playing variations on the roles she would spend her career on. She became friends with John Ford while making Hangman's House in 1928 and made seven more films with him. In 1939, she took on her best-remembered role as Sherlock Holmes' landlady, Mrs. Hudson, and played the role in ten films and numerous radio plays.  She was a charter member of the Hollywood Canteen, entertaining servicemen throughout the Second World War. On the radio show Those We Love, she played the regular role of Mrs. Emmett.

She entered retirement just as television reshaped the entertainment industry, making only a single appearance in that medium.

She was active in the Daughters of Scotia auxiliary of the Order of Scottish Clans. 

She lived out her final years in Pasadena, California with her daughter and grandson. She died at age 81 on 23 August 1963 in Pasadena after a long illness.

Selected filmography

 The Dome Doctor (1925, Short) - Woman with Long Hair (uncredited)
 The Home Maker (1925) - Mrs. Hennessy
 Tessie (1925) - Aunt Maggie
 One of the Bravest (1925) - Tenement Boy's Mother
 The People vs. Nancy Preston (1925) - Mrs. Tifft
 Lights of Old Broadway (1925) - Minor Role (uncredited)
 Black Paradise (1926) - Mrs. Murphy
 The Dixie Flyer (1926) - Mrs. Clancy
 Naughty Nanette (1927) - Mrs. Rooney
 The Claw (1927) - Bit (uncredited)
 Annie Laurie (1927) - First Midwife (uncredited)
 Clancy's Kosher Wedding (1927) - Molly Clancy
 Little Mickey Grogan (1927) - Kind Landlady (uncredited)
 The Matinee Idol (1928) - Woman in Audience (uncredited)
 Hangman's House (1928) - The Woman at Hogan's Hideout (uncredited)
 Our Dancing Daughters (1928) - Scrubwoman (uncredited)
 The Ol' Gray Hoss (1928, Short) - First taxi passenger
 The Old Code (1928) - Mary MacGregr
 The Black Watch (1929) - Sandy's Wife (uncredited)
 Madame X (1929) - Nursemaid (uncredited)
 Is Everybody Happy? (1929) - Neighbor (uncredited)
 The Saturday Night Kid (1929) - Reducing customer (uncredited)
 The Sky Hawk (1929) - Mary, the Maid (uncredited)
 Dynamite (1929) - Neighbor at Store (uncredited)
 Sunny Side Up (1929) - Grocery Shopper (uncredited)
 Hell's Heroes (1929) - Choir Member (uncredited)
 Seven Days' Leave (1930) - Bit (uncredited)
 The Duke of Dublin (1930, Short)
 His Honor the Mayor (1930, Short)
 When the Wind Blows (1930, Short) - Chubby's Mother (uncredited)
 Las Fantasmas (1930, Short) - Chubby's Mama
 Roaring Ranch (1930) - Mrs. O'Riley (uncredited)
 Let Us Be Gay (1930) - Mrs. McIntyre (uncredited)
 Our Blushing Brides (1930) - Mrs. Mannix - Tenement Woman (uncredited)
 Manslaughter (1930) - Cook (uncredited)
 Song o' My Heart (1930) - Irish Woman (uncredited)
 Anybody's Woman (1930) - (uncredited)
 Dance with Me (1930, Short)
 Oh, For a Man! (1930) - Stage Door Admirer with Violets (uncredited)
 Unfaithful (1931) - Bit (uncredited)
 Subway Express (1931) - Mrs. Delaney
 Always Goodbye (1931) - Mrs. MacPherson, Moviegoer (uncredited)
 The Black Camel (1931) - Mrs. MacMasters
 The Brat (1931) - Angry Wife in Night Court (uncredited)
 Waterloo Bridge (1931) - Distraught Woman on Stairway (uncredited)
 24 Hours (1931) - Nurse (uncredited)
 Possessed (1931) - Woman at Political Rally (uncredited)
 Frankenstein (1931) - Mourner (uncredited)
 Models and Wives (1931, Short)
 A House Divided (1931) - Townswoman (uncredited)
 Ladies of the Big House (1931) - Inmate (uncredited)
 Delicious (1931) - Dancer (uncredited)
 A Fool's Advice (1932) - Woman at Rally (uncredited)
 Texas Cyclone (1932) - Katie
 The Impatient Maiden (1932) - Irish Neighbor (uncredited)
 The Expert (1932) - Neighbor (uncredited)
 The Big Timer (1932) - 2nd Job Seeker (uncredited)
 Dancers in the Dark (1932) - Cleaning Lady (uncredited)
 Devil's Lottery (1932) - Inquest Onlooker (uncredited)
 Scandal for Sale (1932) - Hotel Resident (uncredited)
 The Trial of Vivienne Ware (1932) - Court Matron (uncredited)
 Radio Patrol (1932) - Landlady (uncredited)
 Beauty Parlor (1932) - Landlady (uncredited)
 Almost Married (1932) - Cook
 70,000 Witnesses (1932) - Scrubwoman (uncredited)
 Blonde Venus (1932) - Landlady (uncredited)
 Pack Up Your Troubles (1932) - Mrs. MacTavish (uncredited)
 Wild Girl (1932) - Washerwoman (uncredited)
 Call Her Savage (1932) - Lady in Tenement (uncredited)
 Laughter in Hell (1933) - Townswoman (uncredited)
 She Done Him Wrong (1933) - Cleaning Lady (uncredited)
 Her Splendid Folly (1933) - Mrs. Clancey
 Ladies They Talk About (1933) - Prisoner in Visiting Room (uncredited)
 Men Must Fight (1933) - Pacifist Audience Member (uncredited)
 Nature in the Wrong (1933, Short) - Mrs. Clancy (uncredited)
 Sweepings (1933) - Mrs. Patrick O'Leary (uncredited)
 The Whirlwind (1933) - Mrs. Curtis
 The Kiss Before the Mirror (1933) - Scrubwoman (uncredited)
 Pilgrimage (1933) - Mrs. MacGregor (uncredited)
 The Power and the Glory (1933) - Nurse (uncredited)
 Doctor Bull (1933) - Townswoman at Meeting (uncredited)
 Brief Moment (1933) - Cook (uncredited)
 Footlight Parade (1933) - Wardrobe Woman on Bus (uncredited)
 My Woman (1933) - Woman at Ironing Board (uncredited)
 Meet the Baron (1933) - Washer Woman (uncredited)
 Broadway Through a Keyhole (1933) - Cleaning Woman (uncredited)
 The Invisible Man (1933) - Screaming Woman (uncredited)
 Design for Living (1933) - Theatre Chambermaid (uncredited)
 The World Changes (1933) - Lady at Party (uncredited)
 Beloved (1934) - Mrs. O'Leary
 The Woman Condemned (1934) - Crying Woman at Night Court (uncredited)
 Voice in the Night (1934) - Woman on Phone in Montage (uncredited)
 Manhattan Melodrama (1934) - Boat Passenger (uncredited)
 Change of Heart (1934) - Woman in Street (uncredited)
 Murder at the Vanities (1934) - Assistant Wardrobe Woman (uncredited)
 The Loudspeaker (1934) - Landlady (uncredited)
 The Most Precious Thing in Life (1934) - Washerwoman (uncredited)
 A Man's Game (1934) - Landlady (uncredited)
 The World Moves On (1934) - English Soldier's Mother (uncredited)
 Baby Take a Bow (1934) - Mrs. O'Brien (uncredited)
 Cross Streets (1934) - Sonny's Mother
 Whom the Gods Destroy (1934) - Newfoundlander (uncredited)
 The Defense Rests (1934) - Scrub Woman (uncredited)
 I Give My Love (1934) - Marie (uncredited)
 Our Daily Bread (1934) - Community Woman in Cottage (uncredited)
 One More River (1934) - Cook (uncredited)
 The Man from Hell (1934) - Mrs. Frank McCarrol (uncredited)
 Charlie Chan in London (1934) - Prison Visitor (uncredited)
 Flirtation (1934) - Woman on a Window (uncredited)
 The Little Minister (1934) - Nanny
 I'm a Father (1935, Short) - Neighbor
 Vanessa: Her Love Story (1935) - Mrs. Leathwaite
 Bride of Frankenstein (1935) - Hans' Wife
 Vagabond Lady (1935) - Myrtle - Cleaning Lady (uncredited)
 $10 Raise (1935) - Landlady (uncredited)
 Ginger (1935) - Mrs. Monohan (uncredited)
 The Irish in Us (1935) - Ma O'Hara
 Bonnie Scotland (1935) - Mrs. Bickerdike
 Waterfront Lady (1935) - Mrs. O'Flaherty
 Metropolitan (1935) - Mrs. Tolentino (uncredited)
 Mutiny on the Bounty (1935) - Peddler (uncredited)
 The Lady Consents (1936) - Apple Lady (uncredited)
 Little Lord Fauntleroy (1936) - Farmer's Wife on Way to Church (uncredited)
 Laughing Irish Eyes (1936) - Mrs. O'Keefe
 Share the Wealth (1936, Short) - Ma MacClyde
 Forgotten Faces (1936) - Mrs. O'Leary
 Little Miss Nobody (1936) - Mrs. Biddle (uncredited)
 The White Angel (1936) - Nursing Applicant (uncredited)
 Mary of Scotland (1936) - Nurse
 Yellowstone (1936) - Mrs. McDougall (uncredited)
 Stage Struck (1936) - Mrs. Cassidy
 The Plot Thickens (1936) - Woman with Bag (uncredited)
 After the Thin Man (1936) - Rose (uncredited)
 The Plough and the Stars (1936) - Woman at Barricades
 Great Guy (1936) - Mrs. Ogilvie
 The Great O'Malley (1937) - Mrs. O'Malley
 Nancy Steele Is Missing! (1937) - Mrs. Watson - Landlady (uncredited)
 Her Husband Lies (1937) - Mrs. Jenks (uncredited)
 Racketeers in Exile (1937) - Irish Woman (uncredited)
 Way Out West (1937) - Cook (uncredited)
 That I May Live (1937) - Mrs. Healy (uncredited)
 Pick A Star (1937) - Mrs. Watts - Undertaker's Wife (uncredited)
 The Man in Blue (1937) - Woman (uncredited)
 Married Before Breakfast (1937) - Mrs. Nevins (uncredited)
 One Man Justice (1937) - Bridget
 Meet the Boyfriend (1937) - Mrs. Grimes
 The Toast of New York (1937) - Mrs. Callahan - Charwoman (uncredited)
 You Can't Have Everything (1937) - Y.W.C.A. Scrub Woman (uncredited)
 Souls at Sea (1937) - Cook (uncredited)
 Double Wedding (1937) - Mrs. Keough
 A Damsel in Distress (1937) - Cook (uncredited)
 You're Only Young Once (1937) - Mary's Mother (uncredited)
 Mannequin (1937) - Mrs. O'Rourke (uncredited)
 Lady Behave! (1937) - Cook
 Friend Indeed (1937, Short) - Housekeeper
 Kidnapped (1938) - Mrs. MacDonald
 Blond Cheat (1938) - Maggie - the Charwoman (uncredited)
 City Streets (1938) - Mrs. Devlin
 Gateway (1938) - Scottish Mother (uncredited)
 Campus Confessions (1938) - Mrs. Twill (uncredited)
 Vacation from Love (1938) - Maggie, the Cook (uncredited)
 Angels with Dirty Faces (1938) - Mrs. Patrick McGee (uncredited)
 Thanks for Everything (1938) - Maggie, Irish Woman (uncredited)
 Off the Record (1939) - Mrs. Finnegan (uncredited)
 Wings of the Navy (1939) - Irene's Housekeeper (uncredited)
 Tail Spin (1939) - Mrs. Lee
 The Hound of the Baskervilles (1939) - Mrs. Hudson
 Broadway Serenade (1939) - Annie (uncredited)
 Code of the Streets (1939) - Mrs. Flaherty (uncredited)
 Tell No Tales (1939) - Mrs. Bryant (uncredited)
 Racketeers of the Range (1939) - Mary - Benson's Housekeeper (uncredited)
 Captain Fury (1939) - Mrs. Bailey
 The Jones Family in Hollywood (1939) - Landlady (uncredited)
 She Married a Cop (1939) - Ma Duffy
 The Story That Couldn't Be Printed (1939, Short) - Woman Reading Newspaper (uncredited)
 The Adventures of Sherlock Holmes (1939) - Mrs. Hudson
 Parents on Trial (1939) - Martha
 The Escape (1939) - Neighbor (uncredited)
 Mr. Smith Goes to Washington (1939) - Woman (uncredited)
 The Marshal of Mesa City (1939) - Mrs. Dudley
 Rulers of the Sea (1939) - Mrs. Ogilvie (uncredited)
 Day-Time Wife (1939) - Scrubwoman (uncredited)
 The Night of Nights (1939) - Mrs. O'Leary (uncredited)
 Joe and Ethel Turp Call on the President (1939) - 1st Pencil Woman (uncredited)
 My Son Is Guilty (1939) - Mrs. Montabelli (uncredited)
 The Invisible Man Returns (1940) - Cookie, the Cook (uncredited)
 Women Without Names (1940) - Juror (uncredited)
 My Son, My Son! (1940) - Mrs. Mulvaney
 Saps at Sea (1940) - Mrs. O'Riley (uncredited)
 Tear Gas Squad (1940) - Mrs. Sullivan
 I Take This Oath (1940) - Mrs. Eileen Hanagan
 Brother Orchid (1940) - Mrs. Sweeney - Flo's Landlady (uncredited)
 The Last Alarm (1940) - Mrs. Hadley
 The Man Who Talked Too Much (1940) - Mrs. Dunn (uncredited)
 Queen of the Mob (1940) - Tenement Landlady
 When the Daltons Rode (1940) - Ma Dalton
 Young People (1940) - Old Woman (uncredited)
 Public Deb No. 1 (1940) - Landlady (uncredited)
 Nobody's Children (1940) - Mary
 Go West (1940) - Train Passenger (uncredited)
 No, No, Nanette (1940) - Gertrude, the Cook
 Kitty Foyle (1940) - First Charwoman (uncredited)
 The Invisible Woman (1940) - Mrs. Bates
 Flight from Destiny (1941) - Martha
 Pot o' Gold (1941) - Ma McCorkle
 Double Cross (1941) - Mrs. Murray
 Unfinished Business (1941) - Miss Brady (uncredited)
 Unexpected Uncle (1941) - Mrs. Mason (uncredited)
 It Started with Eve (1941) - Mrs. O'Toole - Cleaning Lady (uncredited)
 How Green Was My Valley (1941) - Gossiper (uncredited)
 Appointment for Love (1941) - Martha
 Borrowed Hero (1941) - Mrs. Riley
 Riot Squad (1941) - Mrs. McGonigle
 Sealed Lips (1942) - Mrs. Ann Morton (Fred's mother)
 Blue, White and Perfect (1942) - Mrs. Flaherty - Mike's Landlady (uncredited)
 Bombay Clipper (1942) - Abigail 'Mag' MacPherson
 Fly-by-Night (1942) - Ma Prescott
 The Strange Case of Doctor Rx (1942) - Mrs. Scott (uncredited)
 Dr. Broadway (1942) - Broadway Carrie
 Meet the Stewarts (1942) - Mrs. Stewart
 It Happened in Flatbush (1942) - Mrs. Collins
 Powder Town (1942) - Mrs. Douglas
 The Pride of the Yankees (1942) - Maid (uncredited)
 Sherlock Holmes and the Voice of Terror (1942) - Mrs. Hudson (uncredited)
 Halfway to Shanghai (1942) - Mrs. McIntyre
 The Mummy's Tomb (1942) - Jane Banning
 Gentleman Jim (1942) - Mrs. Casey (uncredited)
 The Boss of Big Town (1942) - Mrs. Lane
 Sherlock Holmes and the Secret Weapon (1942) - Mrs. Hudson
 Forever and a Day (1943) - Woman in Air Raid Shelter (uncredited)
 Sherlock Holmes in Washington (1943) - Mrs. Hudson (uncredited)
 Keep 'Em Slugging (1943) - Mrs. Banning
 Sarong Girl (1943) - Mattie
 Two Tickets to London (1943) - Mrs. Tinkle
 Sherlock Holmes Faces Death (1943) - Mrs. Hudson (uncredited)
 Here Comes Kelly (1943) - Mrs. Kelly
 Sweet Rosie O'Grady (1943) - Charwoman (uncredited)
 You're a Lucky Fellow, Mr. Smith (1943) - Woman (uncredited)
 The Spider Woman (1943) - Mrs. Hudson
 Smart Guy (1943) - Maggie
 Whispering Footsteps (1943) - Ma Murphy
 The Racket Man (1944) - Ma Duffy (uncredited)
 Ladies Courageous (1944) - Old Lady (uncredited)
 Million Dollar Kid (1944) - Mrs. McGinnis
 Hat Check Honey (1944) - Jennie
 The Hour Before the Dawn (1944) - Annie (uncredited)
 Follow the Leader (1944) - Mrs. McGinnis (uncredited)
 Secrets of Scotland Yard (1944) - Libby the Housekeeper (uncredited)
 Secret Command (1944) - Mrs. McKenzie (uncredited)
 The Pearl of Death (1944) - Mrs. Hudson
 Ever Since Venus (1944) - Mrs. Murphy (uncredited)
 National Barn Dance (1944) - Mrs. Owen (uncredited)
 The Last Ride (1944) - Mrs. Mary Kelly
 Irish Eyes Are Smiling (1944) - Irish Woman (uncredited)
 Hollywood Canteen (1944) - Hostess (uncredited)
 Music for Millions (1944) - Hotel Proprietress (uncredited)
 Eadie Was a Lady (1945) - Old Lady (uncredited)
 The Body Snatcher (1945) - Mrs. Mary McBride (uncredited)
 It's a Pleasure (1945) - Tenement Woman (uncredited)
 See My Lawyer (1945) - Mrs. Fillmore
 The Woman in Green (1945) - Mrs. Hudson
 Captain Eddie (1945) - Mrs. Westrom
 Pride of the Marines (1945) - Lady at Bus Stop (uncredited)
 Divorce (1945) - Ellen
 Strange Confession (1945) - Mrs. O'Connor
 Kitty (1945) - Nanny
 Little Giant (1946) - Ma Miller
 Sentimental Journey (1946) - Agnes (uncredited)
 The Hoodlum Saint (1946) - Trina
 Dressed to Kill (1946) - Mrs. Hudson
 In Fast Company (1946) - Mrs. Cassidy
 Shadows Over Chinatown (1946) - Mrs. Conover
 The Dark Horse (1946) - Mrs. Mahoney (uncredited)
 Sing While You Dance (1946) - Mom Henderson
 Sister Kenny (1946) - Mrs. Gordon (uncredited)
 Singin' in the Corn (1946) - Mrs. O'Rourke
 Stallion Road (1947) - Mrs. Ford, Purcell's Housekeeper (uncredited)
 The Long Night (1947) - Old Lady in Crowd (uncredited)
 The Secret Life of Walter Mitty (1947) - Mother Machree (uncredited)
 Exposed (1947) - Miss Keets
 The Invisible Wall (1947) - Mrs. Bledsoe
 Roses Are Red (1947) - Scrubwoman (uncredited)
 The Judge Steps Out (1948) - Annie, the Scrub Woman (uncredited)
 Angels' Alley (1948) - Mrs. Mamie Mahoney
 Fort Apache (1948) - Ma (barmaid)
 Big Town Scandal (1948) - Mary - Cleaning Woman (uncredited)
 The Vicious Circle (1948) - Mrs. Hogan (revised version) (uncredited)
 The Strange Mrs. Crane (1948) - Nora
 Hills of Home (1948) - Mrs. Burnbrae (uncredited)
 Kidnapped (1948) - Scottish Woman (uncredited)
 The Dark Past (1948) - Passenger on Bus (uncredited)
 Highway 13 (1948) - Aunt Myrt Lacy
 Shamrock Hill  (1949)  - Grandma Rogan
 Tucson (1949) - Housemother (uncredited)
 Mighty Joe Young (1949) - Old Woman (unconfirmed)
 Mr. Soft Touch (1949) - Slatternly Woman Tenant (uncredited)
 Haunted Trails (1949) - Aunt Libby
 Deputy Marshall (1949) - Mrs. Lance
 Challenge to Lassie (1949) - Tenement Neighbor (uncredited)
 The File on Thelma Jordon (1950) - Charwoman (uncredited)
 West of Wyoming (1950) - Nora Jones

References

External links

1882 births
1963 deaths
British expatriate actresses in the United States
Burials at Rose Hills Memorial Park
Actresses from Glasgow
Scottish actresses
Scottish film actresses
Scottish silent film actresses
Scottish radio actors
Scottish theatre people
20th-century Scottish actresses
Scottish emigrants to the United States